is a Japanese manga series written and illustrated by Haruka Kawachi. It was serialized in Shodensha's josei manga magazine Feel Young from June 2009 to December 2011. An anime television series adaptation by Doga Kobo aired on Fuji TV's Noitamina block between July and September 2012. The anime series has been licensed by Sentai Filmworks in North America.

Plot
A young man named Hazuki (Yuichi Nakamura) decides to work at a flower shop after he falls for the owner, Rokka (Sayaka Ohara). Unfortunately, Hazuki can see the spirit of Rokka's dead husband, Atsushi (Jun Fukuyama), who has made a point of sticking around and interfering with any relationship Rokka may find herself in. What  Atsushi did not count on was being visible to Hazuki.

Media

Manga
Shodensha collected its chapters in four tankōbon volumes, released from February 20, 2010, to April 7, 2012. An additional story, was serialized in the same magazine from February 8, 2012, to August 8, 2013: the collected volume was released on November 8, 2013.

Anime
An anime television series adaptation by Doga Kobo aired in Fuji TV's Noitamina block between July 5and September 13, 2012, and was simulcast by Crunchyroll. The series has been licensed in North America by Sentai Filmworks.

Episode list

References

External links
Official anime website 

2009 manga
2012 anime television series debuts
Doga Kobo
Josei manga
Noitamina
Romance anime and manga
Sentai Filmworks
Shodensha manga
Supernatural anime and manga